Miltonia candida, the snow-white miltonia, is a species of orchid endemic to southeastern Brazil.

References

External links 

candida
Endemic orchids of Brazil
Flora of the Atlantic Forest